Bartlett is a comedy web television series created by writer/director Martin Edwards and executive producer Chrissy Mazzeo. It was released on January 30, 2018 on Amazon Prime. It is now available on YouTube, Tubi, and Plex.

The series is a satire of advertising and Silicon Valley culture, set in a failing San Francisco ad agency known as Agency SF. It revolves around a struggling creative director who is desperate to quit his job and become a full time musician, but feels compelled to right several wrongs first.

Bartlett was an official selection of the 2017 New York Television Festival.

Cast 
The cast:
 Anthony Veneziale as Roger Newhouse, a creative director ready to follow his musical passion, but held back by the need to “fix things” with all the people he’s wronged.
 Chrissy Mazzeo as Maggie Knowland, Roger's former creative partner and lover who is asked by Bob to come back and fix the mess that her ex has wrought.
 Don Reed as Bob Freeman, Roger's boss who is torn between firing his protege and proving his leadership to his own boss.
 Eirinie Carson as Caitlin Bodley, the only account executive left at Agency SF, whose loyalty to Roger may be her Achilles heel.
 Utkarsh Ambudkar as Sanjay Kahn, Maggie's talented and driven ad executive boyfriend who struggles with empathy.
 Lin-Manuel Miranda as Jesus, a Shakespeare-quoting freelancer on a mission to help Roger win the pitch that could fix everything.
 Irene Sofia Lucio as Mary, Jesus' over-enthusiastic collaborator.
 Nate Duncan as Hans, Roger's German mechanic who literally holds the keys to one of Roger's last happy places—his vintage Porsche 911.
 Michael X. Sommers as Mike the Plant Guy, a passionate horticulturalist who originally inspires Roger to follow his dream, and then gets fired.

Episodes

Production 
Bartlett is an independent production. It was produced by Rivkah Beth Medow and executive produced by Chrissy Mazzeo, Anthony Veneziale and Evan Shaprio, who previously worked with Veneziale, Utkarsh Ambudkar and Lin-Manuel Miranda on the Seeso comedy improv series Freestyle Love Supreme.

The series was written and directed by Martin Edwards and based on his play, Pitch Perfect, which was developed at Berkeley Rep and produced by Central Works Theater in 2013. Both projects were inspired by his time as a creative director at Grey Advertising in New York and San Francisco.

References 

English-language television shows
Television shows filmed in California